Erick Yomer Rosa Pacheco (born March 18, 2000) is a Dominican professional boxer who has held the WBA (Regular) mini flyweight title since 2021.

Professional career

Early career
Rosa was scheduled to make his professional debut against Oscar Bermudez Salas on October 24, 2020, for the vacant WBA Fedelatin and WBC Latino minimumweight titles. Rosa won the fight by unanimous decision, with two of the judges scoring all ten rounds in his favor, while the third judge awarded him a 98-92 scorecard.

Rosa was scheduled to defend his titles against Byron Castellon on December 16, 2020, in his second consecutive main event. The fight was originally set for the undercard of the Wilfredo Méndez and Alexis Diaz title fight. The title fight was later cancelled as Méndez withdrew due to illness the day before the event. Accordingly, Rosa vs. Castellon was announced as the new main event. He won the fight by unanimous decision, with scores of 97-93, 98-92 and 99-91.

Rosa was scheduled to make the second defense of his titles against Kenny Cano on March 12, 2021. Rosa justified his role as the favorite, winning the fight by a third-round knockout. It was his first career stoppage victory.

Rosa was scheduled to fight the undefeated Ricardo Astuvilca for the interim WBA minimumweight title on July 21, 2021. Astuvilca was the more experienced fighter coming into the bout, having won a total of 21 professional fights. The fight was scheduled as the co-main event for the Alberto Puello and Jesús Antonio Rubio WBA interim-super lightweight world title fight. Rosa won the interim title with by unanimous decision, with two of the judges awarding him a 117-110 scorecard, while the third judge scored it 114-113 for Rosa. Astuvilca scored the only knockdown of the fight in the fourth round, having dropped Rosa with a left hook, although Rosa claimed he slipped.

On August 25, 2021, the WBA ordered all of its interim titles to be vacated, in an effort to reduce the number of belts within the organization.

WBA Regular mini flyweight champion

Rosa vs. Saludar
On September 10, 2021, it was announced that Rosa would challenge WBA (Regular) mini flyweight titlist Vic Saludar. The fight was scheduled for December 9, 2021, at a venue to be determined, in Santo Domingo, Dominican Republic. The fight was later postponed for December 21, 2021, and was held at the Hotel Catalonia Malecon Center. Rosa won the fight by split decision, with two judges scoring the fight 116–109 and 113–112 in his favor, while the third judge scored it 113–112 for Saludar. Rosa scored knockdowns with a quick left in the third round, as well as with a left hook in the ninth round, while Saludar notched his sole knockdown with a right straight in the tenth round.

Rosa vs. Knockout
Rosa was expected to make his first WBA Regular title defense against the former WBC Silver minimumweight titleholder Carlos Ortega on July 15, 2022, in Santo Domingo, Dominican Republic. The fight was called-off by Rosa's promoter Shuan Boxing only hours before it was supposed to take place. Rosa and his team instead accepted a title unification offer made by the IBF mini flyweight champion Daniel Valladares. On September 30, 2022, Rosa was ordered to face Knockout CP Freshmart in a title consolidation bout. On November 24, it was revealed that the pair had reached terms for a title consolidation bout. The fight was expected to take place on December 17, 2022, on the undercard of the Frank Martin and Michel Rivera lightweight bout. It was later cancelled, as Knockout wasn't able to enter the United States due to a visa issue. This prompted the WBA to call for a purse bid, which was won by Petchyindee Boxing Promotions with a bid of $140,000. The title fight was booked to take place on March 1, 2023, in Nakhon Sawan, Thailand. Rosa and his team were briefly detained by the Thailand immigration officials upon arrival on February 20, due to an issue over the boxer’s visa status. Following their release on February 21, Rosa's promoter Belgica Pena announced that they withdrew from the fight.

The sanctioning body once again re-ordered Rosa to face Knockout in a title consolidation bout on March 16 and gave the two camps until March 28 to come to terms before a purse bid would be called, with a stipulation that the fight must be organized within 45-60 days from the time of the purse bid.

Professional boxing record

See also
List of world mini-flyweight boxing champions

References

External links

2000 births
Living people
Sportspeople from Santo Domingo
Dominican Republic male boxers
Mini-flyweight boxers
World mini-flyweight boxing champions
World Boxing Association champions